is a Japanese light novel series written by Yoshinobu Akita. It was adapted into manga, five anime television series (Sorcerous Stabber Orphen, Sorcerous Stabber Orphen 2: Revenge, Sorcerous Stabber Orphen (2020), Sorcerous Stabber Orphen: Battle of Kimluck, Sorcerous Stabber Orphen: Chaos in Urbanrama) and a video game.

As of December 2019, the novels had over 14 million copies in circulation.

Plot

The young man Orphen engages in money lending activities in the back streets of the commercial city of Totokanta. Once, he was known as one of the Tower of Fang's most promising black sorcerers. One day, Orphen was approached by Volkan and Dortin, who had a very profitable money making scheme set up. Under the guise of wealthy merchants, they set forth toward the Everlasting household to partake in a marriage fraud. But, there was one problem: Volcan's plan was full of holes, leading one of the sisters to find out about their plan too. Then suddenly, a huge monster attacks the mansion. Among all the commotion, one name rings out: Azalie. This monster was what he was looking for for five years: his older sister Azalie who transformed into a dragonic monster. Between those who seek to kill the monster and Orphen, giving everything to protect it, his peaceful days are at an end. Trying desperately to transform his sister, Azalie, back to her true form leads to a treacherous journey that, ultimately, allows Orphen to learn the vast secrets of his world.

Media

Light novels
After publishing an award-winning Japanese-style fantasy novel Inside a Sparkle from the Snow Yoshinobu Akita who possessed deep admiration for European and American literature started his work on a European-style fantasy about the magically created world of Orphen inhabited by characters with deep personalities that make a reader empathize with them.

The series Orphen came about when author Yoshinobu Akita with Yuuya Kusaka as illustrator created a series of light novels called Sorcerous Stabber Orphen: The Wayward Journey. It consists of 20 novels which were first published by Fujimi Shobo under their Fujimi Fantasia Bunko label in the Monthly Dragon Magazine between 1994 and 2003, and was the basis for the first anime and manga series. In November 2019, a light novel known as the Sorcerous Stabber Orphen Anthology was also released. It features a collection of original stories written by the author, Yoshinobu Akita, as well as guest writers such as Hajime Kanzaka, Yutaka Kono, Koushi Tachibana, Miya Kazuki, and Yomi Hirasaka. Ryo Mizuno was in charge of commentary while the illustrations and cover were drawn by Yuuya Kusaka.

Two years after the beginning of the main novel series, Yoshinobu Akita created a second series called Sorcerous Stabber Orphen: The Reckless Journey, which is a collection of side-stories that depicted more light-hearted and comedic adventures that took place during Orphen's journey, and chronologically set before the events of the main series. The novel series spanned 13 volumes between 1996 and 2003, which were published the same way as the first series. In 2009, he published an additional chapter for the novel on Akita Yoshinobu's Sadami BOX, the author's personal website. In 1997, he released Sorcerous Stabber Orphen: Detour, a short light novel series that consisted of side stories that took place during the first half of Orphen's journey with Claiomh and Majic. The novels spanned two volumes.

In September 2011, T.O Entertainment released a brand new series of the Orphen novels known as Sorcerous Stabber Orphen: New Wayward Journey, which takes place more than two decades after the original series. Orphen is now older and is married to Claiomh Everlasting, both of whom give birth to three daughters that become Sorcerers. Majic is a Sorcerer lecturer at the new school that Orphen runs. Orphen is known as the "Demon King" due to his exploits in the original novels. The main protagonist of the new series is Mayor MacCredy, who is the son of Leticia MacCredy and Forte Puckingham. The novel series originally spanned into 10 volumes between 2011 and 2015. In September 2019, Yoshinobu Akita announced that in commemoration of the series' 25th anniversary, he will be writing a new novel for the main novella series titled Sorcerer Stabber Orphen: Comicron's Plan, a prequel that takes place four years after Orphen departed the Tower of Fangs to search for Azalie, which was released on December 25, 2019. It is tentatively referred to as the "Gap Edition" in the author's afterword which will fill in gaps within the main series' timeline with new stories, with three new volumes currently being planned. The books are published in a standard version and also a special edition version which comes with a behind the scenes booklet about the book and a Drama CD which is based on the new novel series itself. The original Orphen novel series received a reprint as well.

The Slayers vs Orphen novel was a special collaborative novel between Yoshinobu Akita and Hajime Kanzaka and was published in 2005. It was later reprinted in 2013.

During their panel at Anime Expo 2018, J-Novel Club announced that they have licensed the light novels.

Manga
The manga adaptation was created by writer Yoshinobu Akita and artist Hajime Sawada. The manga is split into two separate series: Majutsushi Orphen Haguretabi, which is six volumes long, and the two volume side story known as Majutsushi Orphen MAX. The first volume of the manga series was released in English in March 2005 by ADV Manga.

A doujinshi collection was released called Sorcerous Stabber Orphen Special Parody (Majutsushi O-fuen Haguretabi Spesharu Paarodi).

A new manga adaptation based on the main novels (the "Stray Journey" arc) was created and released by Yoshinobu Akita and illustrator Muraji from March 2017 to November 2018 and collected in five volumes. In July 2018, Seven Seas Entertainment announced their acquisition of the manga's license for English distribution. They released the first two volumes in 2019.

In August 2018, a manga adaptation based on the light novel spin-off series, Sorcerous Stabber Orphen: The Reckless Journey (Majutsushi Orphen: Mubouhen), was released. It is written and illustrated by Yu Yagami (The author of Those Who Hunt Elves). In July 2019, J-Novel Club announced the acquisition of the manga's license for English distribution.

In December 2018, Kirouran and Yoshinobu Akita released the first volume of a two-volume manga adaptation known as Sorcerous Stabber Orphen: Youthful Journey (Majutsushi Orphen: Pre-hen), which adapts the side-stories from Sorcerous Stabber Orphen: Reckless Journey light novels. The manga chronicles Orphen's childhood and misadventures at the Tower of Fangs with his classmates. J-Novel Club released the manga in English.

Anime

The original Sorcerous Stabber Orphen anime series was animated by J.C.Staff and produced by Kadokawa Shoten, Orphen was airing simultaneously on the TBS and HBC from October 3, 1998, to March 27, 1999, then it was released in North America on DVD and VHS by ADV Films in 2001. It has 24 episodes in length.

The original Sorcerous Stabber Orphen anime series was later released in Australia by Madman Entertainment in May 2002, the MSRP for the first series of Orphen in Australia were initially $29.95 AUD for DVD version, $22.95 AUD for VHS version, and $11.95 AUD for DVD version (which include the first three episode of the anime) that shipped with a PC PowerPlay Magazine.

A second series called Sorcerous Stabber Orphen 2: Revenge (Hepburn: Majutsushi Ōfen Ribenji), or Orphen Revenge, was later broadcast in 1999. The second anime series was released on DVD in North America in December 2003 by ADV Films. It has 23 episodes in length. In 2009, Sentai Filmworks released a box set featuring all 47 episodes of the two seasons of Orphen in an economic box set. A 2-disc SD Blu-ray of the entire series was released on 20 August 2019.

A new TV anime adaptation has been announced to commemorate the series' 25th anniversary. The series was initially set to premiere in 2019, but was rescheduled to premiere from January to March 2020.

The new series premiered from January 7 to March 31, 2020, on AT-X, BS Fuji, Tokyo MX, and Wowow. The new series is animated by Studio Deen and directed by Takayuki Hamana, with Reiko Yoshida handling series composition, and Takahiko Yoshida designing the characters. Showtaro Morikubo reprised his role as Orphen, while the rest of the characters had new voice actors. Funimation licensed the show outside of Asia. An English dub premiered January 21, 2020. Following Sony's acquisition of Crunchyroll, the series was moved to Crunchyroll. It ran for 13 episodes, with an unaired episode bundled with the series' second Blu-ray volume on 8 May 2020.

A second season of the 2020 remake was announced with the title of Sorcerous Stabber Orphen: Battle of Kimluck. It aired from January 20 to March 31, 2021. Funimation licensed the second season and streamed it on its website in North America and the British Isles, in Europe through Wakanim, and in Australia and New Zealand through AnimeLab. The English dub launched on its service June 9, 2021.

A third season was announced on September 26, 2022, titled Sorcerous Stabber Orphen: Chaos in Urbanrama. Kenji Konuta is replacing Reiko Yoshida as the scriptwriter. It premiered on January 18, 2023.

Video game

A single player console role-playing video game was released for the PlayStation 2 in 2000 by Kadokawa Shoten in Japan as Sorcerous Stabber Orphen and by Activision in North America and Europe as Orphen: Scion of Sorcery. It included a whole new adventure and a few video scenes with more sophistication but a minor difference in the voices and personalities of the characters. Reviews of the game were mixed.

Reception
As of December 2019, the novels had over 14 million copies in circulation.

In the 21st Anime Grand Prix polls conducted by Animage in June 1999, Orphen was voted the second "Favorite Male Character", the TV series was vote the eight "Anime Title Of The Year" and first Ending themes from the anime, "Last Kiss" by Tanpopo was ranked 16th placed for "Best Theme Song Of The Year".

Mike Crandol of the Anime News Network called the series a "fairly enjoyable fantasy adventure" but criticized it for falling into "a pitfall common for anime sword-and-sorcery series." He later called the anime "all-around average...in terms of art, music, and animation."

References

External links
 

1994 Japanese novels
1996 Japanese novels
1998 anime television series debuts
1998 manga
1999 anime television series debuts
2005 Japanese novels
2019 Japanese novels
2011 Japanese novels
2020 anime television series debuts
2023 anime television series debuts
ADV Films
Adventure anime and manga
AT-X (TV network) original programming
Book series introduced in 1994
Comedy anime and manga
Crunchyroll anime
Fujimi Fantasia Bunko
Fujimi Shobo manga
Funimation
J.C.Staff
J-Novel Club books
Kadokawa Dwango franchises
Kadokawa Shoten manga
Light novels
Medialink
Role-playing video games
Seinen manga
Sentai Filmworks
Seven Seas Entertainment titles
Studio Deen
Sword and sorcery anime and manga
TBS Television (Japan) original programming